Hypolycaena similis is a butterfly in the family Lycaenidae. It was described by Abel Dufrane in 1945. It is found in the Democratic Republic of the Congo.

References

Butterflies described in 1945
Hypolycaenini
Endemic fauna of the Democratic Republic of the Congo